David Earsman (6 January 1882 – 19 January 1919) was an Australian rules footballer who played with Fitzroy and Carlton in the Victorian Football League (VFL).

Notes

External links

Dave Earsman's profile at Blueseum

1882 births
1919 deaths
Australian rules footballers from Victoria (Australia)
Fitzroy Football Club players
Carlton Football Club players
Northcote Football Club players